Westfall is an unincorporated community in Lincoln County, Kansas, United States.

History
A post office was opened in Westfall in 1917, and remained in operation until it was discontinued in 1971.

Education
The community is served by Lincoln USD 298 public school district.

References

Further reading

External links
 Lincoln County maps: Current, Historic, KDOT

Unincorporated communities in Lincoln County, Kansas
Unincorporated communities in Kansas